Friederich Franzl (6 March 1905 – 1989) was an Austrian football goalkeeper who played for Austria in the 1934 FIFA World Cup. He also played for FC Admira Wacker Mödling and Wiener Sport-Club.

References

1905 births
1989 deaths
Austrian footballers
Austria international footballers
Association football goalkeepers
FC Admira Wacker Mödling players
Wiener Sport-Club players
1934 FIFA World Cup players